Pac-Man: Adventures in Time is a 2000 maze video game in the Pac-Man series developed by Creative Asylum and Mind's Eye Productions, and published by Hasbro Interactive, in collaboration with Namco. The game follows a formula similar to the original arcade game, while expanding on it with new features. In the game, Pac-Man travels through various time periods using Professor Pac-Man's time machine to recover pieces of an ancient artifact.

The game was released for Microsoft Windows PCs in 2000.

Gameplay
Like the original Pac-Man, the objective of each level is to guide Pac-Man through a maze and eat all the dots in the maze, while avoiding the prehistoric ghosts that inhabit each level. Eating the power pellets scattered across the maze allows Pac-Man to eat the ghosts for a short period of time, awarding bonus points for eating ghosts continuously. After eating a certain number of dots, a bonus fruit appears in an area of the maze, which grants extra points when eaten. Eating all the dots allows Pac-Man to proceed to the next round. Pac-Man also has the ability to jump, allowing him to dodge ghosts, though a cooldown is triggered when performed; the length varies between game difficulties. If a ghost or deadly object comes in contact with Pac-Man, he loses a life. A game over occurs when all lives are lost. Extra lives are awarded for every 50,000 points scored. If Pac-Man stays on a round for too long, the original ghost gang (Blinky, Pinky, Inky and Clyde) appears and begins chasing Pac-Man more aggressively than the prehistoric ghosts.

Various rounds feature special gimmicks, such as hills that slow Pac-Man down when climbing up and speeds him up when descending, floor levels, elevators, deadly objects or creatures that can kill Pac-Man and the ghosts upon contact, etc. Some mazes take different forms, such as a cube, a cylinder, and a sphere. Said mazes also allow Pac-Man to walk on walls. In underwater sections of mazes, an oxygen meter appears which depletes slowly; Pac-Man loses a life if he runs out of oxygen. Oxygen is replenished by eating dots or by going back on the surface.

The camera tends to follow Pac-Man from a close-up view, though the game allows the maze to be viewed from a perspective on select levels.

The game features 45 rounds, spread across five different time periods such as pre-historic times, ancient Egypt, the Middle Ages, the wild west and the future. Between rounds, there are checkpoints that allow the player to save their game, as well as saving their current score and life count. Bonus mini-games occur after every few rounds, where Pac-Man can obtain bonus points. The mini-games consist of various different play styles. After completing the mazes in quest mode, they are unlocked in the maze mode.

The game features a multiplayer mode, which allows up to four players play as Pac-Man, Ms. Pac-Man, Professor Pac-Man and Baby Pac-Man to compete in various mini-games across different mazes. Unfilled player slots are controlled by the computer. Dot Mania consists of each player competing to be the first to eat 120 dots in a maze of regenerating dots. Time Bomb, in a similar fashion to hot potato, consists of the four players attempting to pass a ticking bomb to other players by coming in contact with them; the player that is holding the time bomb when the timer reaches zero is eliminated from play, and continues until there is one player left. Ghost Tag plays in a similar fashion to Dot Mania, except that 3 randomly selected players start as ghosts. The player that is Pac-Man must eat 120 dots and avoid the player-controlled ghosts. When a ghost catches the player that is Pac-Man, the player's ghost transforms into the player's respective Pac-Man; the player that was previously Pac-Man is turned into a ghost. The multiplayer mode support online and LAN play.

Plot
Ghosts Inky and Clyde steal a golden power pellet known as the Artifact, under the command of a shadowy creature known as Mollusc. Mollusc smashes the Artifact; the result of the explosion scatters the Artifact's four fragmented pieces across time and space. Professor Pac-Man wakes up Pac-Man from his sleep and alerts him about the crisis. Professor Pac-Man prepares a hastily constructed time machine for Pac-Man that allows him to travel through time and recover the Artifact pieces.

Pac-Man travels through various time periods, including prehistoric times, Ancient Egypt, the Middle Ages, and the Wild West. Pac-Man eventually obtains all the artifact pieces; the time machine malfunctions and sends him to the future; with Professor Pac-Man stating that an alternate power source is needed to correctly power the time machine and bring Pac-Man back to the present. Pac-Man reaches the Reactor Core of a station and is able to harness its energy to be finally transported back to his own time period, with the Artifact reassembled.

Pac-Man returns to the present, arriving directly at the second after Mollusc breaks the original Artifact. Pac-Man uses the repaired Artifact to fire a beam that disintegrates Mollusc.

Development
The game was announced on May 5, 2000, in a press release. The voice cast consists of Duncan MacLaren as Pac-Man and Professor Pac-Man, and Matt Clark as Mollusc.

Reception

Pac-Man: Adventures In Time received mostly positive reviews. GameSpot praised the game, saying "The occasionally sluggish control can be a little frustrating, but not enough to take the fun out of the game,". The game currently holds a ranking of 79 out of 100 on Metacritic.

References

2000 video games
Dinosaurs in video games
Hasbro games
Maze games
Mind's Eye Productions games
Multiplayer and single-player video games
Pac-Man
Video games about time travel
Video games developed in the United Kingdom
Windows games
Windows-only games